The 2008-09 Leinster Rugby season was Leinster's seventh competing in the Celtic League alongside which they competed in the 2007–08 Heineken Cup. Though Leinster were eliminated early from the Heineken Cup, the season ended in celebration as 'the Lions' were crowned champions of the 2007–08 Celtic League. Home games were played in the RDS Arena, Dublin.

Match Attendance 
Leinster's average Celtic League attendance was 14,361, the League's highest .

2007–08 Celtic League Fixtures

2007/08 Heineken Cup Fixtures/Results

Pool Table
{| class="wikitable" style="text-align: center;"
|-
!width="200"|Team
!width="20"|Pld
!width="20"|W
!width="20"|D
!width="20"|L
!width="20"|TF
!width="20"|PF
!width="20"|PA
!width="25"|+/-
!width="20"|BP
!width="20"|Pts
|- bgcolor="#ccffcc"
|align=left|  Toulouse (4)
|6||4||0||2||13||130||76||+54||4||20
|-
|align=left|  Leicester Tigers
|6||3||0||3||10||110||79||+31||2||14
|-
|align=left|  Leinster
|6||3||0||3||7||95||123||−28||0||12
|-
|align=left|  Edinburgh
|6||2||0||4||8||85||142||−57||1||9
|}

See also 
2007-08 Celtic League
2007–08 Heineken Cup

References

2007–08
2007–08 Celtic League by team
2007–08 in Irish rugby union
2007–08 Heineken Cup by team